Kelly Ann Karbacz is an American actress.

Early life and education
Karbacz was born in Queens, New York and raised in Queens and Manhattan. In 1996, Karbacz graduated from Stuyvesant High School in New York City. She attended the Lee Strasberg Theatre Institute, part of the Tisch School of the Arts at New York University.

Personal life
In 2005, Karbacz met Phillip James Griffith on the production of But I'm a Cheerleader for the New York Musical Theatre Festival and they married in September 2007.

Credits

Filmography

Theatre

References

External links
 

Actresses from New York City
American film actresses
American stage actresses
American television actresses
Living people
People from Queens, New York
Stuyvesant High School alumni
Tisch School of the Arts alumni
Year of birth missing (living people)